Acacia gelasina is a shrub belonging to the genus Acacia and the subgenus Phyllodineae. It is native to a small area on the west coast in the Mid West region of Western Australia.

See also
 List of Acacia species

References

gelasina
Acacias of Western Australia
Taxa named by Bruce Maslin